ABC 24 usually refers to the former name of the ABC News channel, ABC News 24 in Australia.

ABC 24 may also refer to the following American Broadcasting Company (ABC) affiliates:
KVUE in Austin, Texas
WATN-TV in Memphis, Tennessee
WGXA-DT2 in Macon, Georgia
WJET-TV in Erie, Pennsylvania
WNWO-TV in Toledo, Ohio (formerly with ABC from 1967 to 1995; now affiliated with NBC)